In the music industry, a 360 deal (from 360° deal) is a business relationship between an artist and a music industry company. The company agrees to provide financial and other support for the artist, including direct advances as well as support in marketing, promotion, touring and other areas. In turn, the artist agrees to give the company a percentage of an increased number of their revenue streams, often including everything from digital and online streaming, live performance, merchandise sales, endorsement deals as well as songwriting royalties.

Developed within the last 20 years (in the 21st century), the business arrangement is an alternative to the traditional recording contract where the artist usually has control of personal revenue streams (outside the core business relationship around the sharing of revenues in music production). In a 360 deal, a company typically agrees to support an artist upfront in a greater amount than covered by a traditional recording contract, on the condition of receiving a percentage of revenue from the traditional as well as these additional areas.

At the turn of the century, revenues from recorded music fell dramatically, and the profit margins traditionally associated with the record industry disappeared. The 360 deal, which began to show up in the early 2000s, reflects an attempt by the industry to tap into what traditionally had been the artists' exclusive domain of money making opportunities such as shows, sponsorship deals or merchandising.

History 

According to Jeff Hanson, head of Silent Majority Group, the first new artist 360° deal was created by Hanson along with attorneys Jim Zumwalt and Kent Marcus, and Jim's partner Orville. It was submitted to Atlantic Records for the rock band Paramore while Hanson, Marcus and Zumwalt were employed by the label. Hanson has said there was strong resistance to the deal by both label and band and that he had to fight to make it happen, but believes his efforts were vindicated by the band's subsequent success, saying: "How else would a label have been patient enough to put the band on three straight Warped Tours and down-streamed the band to Fueled by Ramen all while losing millions of dollars?"

360 deals have been made by traditional record companies, as in Robbie Williams's pioneering deal with EMI in 2002.
They have also been made between artists and promoters, as with Live Nation's 2007 deal with Madonna
and 2008 deal with Jay-Z.

Criticism 

360° deals have attracted criticism from various quarters. Panos Panay, CEO of online music platform Sonicbids, has said:

"If you want to find out the future of 360° deals, look at Motown in the late 60s. Motown was the pioneer of a 360° deal ... They owned your likeness, your touring, publishing, record royalties, told you what to wear, told you how to walk … It made for great entertainment but if you look at every one of those artists, what happened? Sooner or later they said, 'I’m not going to go on the road for 200 shows because you tell me so. I’m an artist! I’m a creative person!' Eventually all these artists left ... There’s two things we know about creativity: you can’t force it and you can’t really control it."

Mac DeMarco,  musician, criticized 360 deals for taking profits, saying:

 "Do not sign a 360 deal. I don’t care how much money they’re offering you, don’t [take it]. It’s an awful, awful idea. It’s a long time, a really long time. And they own your image. They take money from your merch on tour -- nobody should touch that. I didn’t know that some bands don’t own their merch, which to me is like -- straight up, you’re being robbed. You can make money selling merch at shows, so it’s good if you own it. Thumbs up, bonus for you. Do not give anybody that merch money, or your show money. They’re not on the stage, and they’re probably not even in the city [you’re playing]. Forget about it."

References 

Music industry